Warsaw is the largest city in Poland and its economic and business centre.

The city's current tallest building is the Varso Tower, which is the tallest building in the European Union.

Tallest buildings 
This includes spires and architectural details but does not include antenna masts. An equals sign (=) following a rank indicates the same a height between two or more buildings. The "Year" column indicates the year in which a building was completed.

Tallest under construction, approved and proposed

Under construction 
This lists buildings that are under construction in Warsaw and are planned to rise at least .

Approved 
This list contains buildings that are approved by the city for construction and are planned to rise at least .

Proposed 
This lists buildings that are proposed for construction in Warsaw and are planned to rise at least .

See also
List of tallest buildings in Poland

References

External links
Buildings in Warsaw, skyscrapercenter.com

 
Warsaw
Tallest